Abacetus patrizii is a species of ground beetle in the subfamily Pterostichinae. It was described by Straneo in 1938.

References

patrizii
Beetles described in 1938